Adieu Philippine ("Farewell, Philippine") is a 1962 French film directed by Jacques Rozier. Although obscure and difficult to screen, it has been praised as one of the key films of the French New Wave. It premiered at the 1962 Cannes Film Festival.

Plot
Michel is a bored young man in Paris about to be sent to Algeria in the army. He works as a camera technician at a TV station. One day he meets two teenage girls, Juliette and Liliane, and begins dating them both separately. Michel purposely gets himself fired from his job and goes on vacation to Corsica to enjoy his last days before going into the army. The two girls follow him there and the three search for a commercial film director who owes Michel money. Eventually, Michel chooses Juliette which creates a rift between the two girls. They finally find the film director who manages to elude them again. After both girls become easily frustrated at the rugged environment and annoyed at each other, it becomes clear that they are both upset at Michel's impending departure. Finally, Michel receives word that he is to join his regiment in four days and must catch the first boat back to the mainland. Juliette and Liliane sadly watch Michel sail away on a boat headed for Algeria.

Cast
Jean-Claude Aimini as Michel
Daniel Descamps as Daniel
Stefania Sabatini as Juliette
Yveline Céry as Liliane
Vittorio Caprioli as Pachala
David Tonelli as Horatio
Annie Markhan as Juliette (voice)
André Tarroux as Régnier de l'Îsle
Christian Longuet as Christian
Michel Soyet as André

Reception
François Truffaut praised the film and called it "the clearest success of the new cinema where spontaneity is all the more powerful when it is the result of long and careful work." In July 2018, it was selected to be screened in the Venice Classics section at the 75th Venice International Film Festival.

References

External links
 

French drama films
1962 films
Films set in Corsica
Films shot in Corse-du-Sud
Films shot in Haute-Corse
1962 directorial debut films
1960s French-language films
1960s French films